What Are We Doing Here? is a Canadian drama film, directed by Julie Hivon and released in 2014. The film centres on a group of friends in their 20s whose lives are shattered when one of them, Yan (Frédéric Millaire-Zouvi), dies in a car accident.

The film stars Charles-Alexandre Dubé as Simon, Joëlle Paré Beaulieu as Roxanne, Maxime Dumontier as Max, Sophie Desmarais as Lily, Marie-Soleil Dion as Rosalie, and Guylaine Tremblay as Roxanne's mother Nicole.

The film was shot in 2013, primarily in Saint-Amable and Granby, Quebec.

Paré-Beaulieu received a Jutra Award nomination for Best Actress at the 17th Jutra Awards.

References

External links

2014 films
2014 drama films
Canadian drama films
Films set in Quebec
Films shot in Quebec
French-language Canadian films
2010s Canadian films